Mt. Zion Presbyterian Church is a historic Presbyterian church located near Bishopville Lee County, South Carolina.  It was built in 1911, and is a linear gable-front, temple-form, two-story brick building in the Neoclassical style. Set upon a raised brick foundation, the building's most imposing feature is its tetrastyle portico featuring a full-width masonry stair with cheek walls and monumental limestone columns and pilasters of the Ionic order. Directly to the rear of the church building is a small, one-story lateral-gabled frame building, constructed in 1851 as Mt. Zion's Session House.

It was added to the National Register of Historic Places in 2003.

References

Presbyterian churches in South Carolina
Churches on the National Register of Historic Places in South Carolina
Neoclassical architecture in South Carolina
Churches completed in 1851
19th-century Presbyterian church buildings in the United States
Churches in Lee County, South Carolina
National Register of Historic Places in Lee County, South Carolina
1851 establishments in South Carolina
Neoclassical church buildings in the United States